Bruno Alves de Souza (born 13 September 1992 in Seabra), or simply Bruno Alves, is a Brazilian footballer. He currently plays for Paysandu.

Honours

Macaé
Campeonato Brasileiro Série C: 2014

Cuiabá
Campeonato Mato-Grossense: 2018

Remo
Campeonato Paraense: 2022

References

External links
 Bruno Alves at playmakerstats.com (English version of ogol.com.br)
 

1992 births
Living people
Brazilian footballers
Macaé Esporte Futebol Clube players
Clube Náutico Capibaribe players
Red Bull Brasil players
Cuiabá Esporte Clube players
Sociedade Esportiva e Recreativa Caxias do Sul players
Esporte Clube Juventude players
Centro Sportivo Alagoano players
Oeste Futebol Clube players
Brusque Futebol Clube players
Clube do Remo players
Associação Atlética Ponte Preta players
Paysandu Sport Club players
Association football forwards